The 1964 Lewisham Council election took place on 7 May 1964 to elect members of Lewisham London Borough Council in London, England. The whole council was up for election and the Labour Party gained control of the council.

Background
These elections were the first to the newly formed borough. Previously elections had taken place in the Metropolitan Borough of Deptford and Metropolitan Borough of Lewisham. These boroughs were joined to form the new London Borough of Lewisham by the London Government Act 1963.

A total of 173 candidates stood in the election for the 60 seats being contested across 23 wards. These included a full slate from the Labour Party, while the Conservative and Liberal parties stood 58 and 46 respectively, and the Communist Party ran 9 candidates. There were 14 three-seat wards and 9 two-seat wards.

This election had aldermen as well as directly elected councillors.  Labour got 8 aldermen and the Conservatives 2.

The Council was elected in 1964 as a "shadow authority" but did not start operations until 1 April 1965.

Election result
The results saw Labour gain the new council with a majority of 30 after winning 45 of the 60 seats. Overall turnout in the election was 34.7%. This turnout included 1,396 postal votes.

|}

Results by ward

Bellingham

Blackheath & Lewisham Village

Brockley

Culverley

Deptford

Drake

Forest Hill

Grinling Gibbons

Grove Park

Honor Oak Park

Ladywell

Lewisham Park

Manor Lee

Marlowe

Pepys

Rushey Green

St Andrew

St Mildred Lee

South Lee

Southend

Sydenham East

Sydenham West

Whitefoot

By-elections between 1964 and 1968
There were no by-elections.

References

1964
1964 London Borough council elections